Shurcheh (also Romanized as Shūrcheh) is a village in Gowdin Rural District, in the Central District of Kangavar County, Kermanshah Province, Iran. At the 2016 census, its population was 696, in 203 families.

References 

Populated places in Kangavar County